Mobile 2.0, refers to a perceived next generation of mobile internet services that leverage the social web, or what some call Web 2.0. The social web includes social networking sites and wikis that emphasise collaboration and sharing amongst users. 
Mobile Web 2.0, with an emphasis on Web, refers to bringing Web 2.0 services to the mobile internet, i.e., accessing aspects of Web 2.0 sites from mobile internet browsers.

By contrast, Mobile 2.0 refers to services that integrate the social web with the core aspects of mobility – personal, localized, always-on and ever-present. These services are appearing on wireless devices such as Smartphones and multimedia feature phones that are capable of delivering rich, interactive services as well as being able to provide access and to the full range of mobile consumer touch points including talking, texting, capturing, sending, listening and viewing. 

Enablers of Mobile 2.0
 Ubiquitous Mobile Broadband Access
 Affordable, unrestricted access to enabling software platforms, tools and technologies
 Open access, with frictionless distribution and monetization
Characteristics of Mobile 2.0
 The social web meets mobility
 Extensive use of User-Generated Content, so that the site is owned by its contributors
 Leveraging services on the web via mashups
 Fully leveraging the mobile device, the mobile context, and delivering a rich mobile user experience
 Personal, Local, Always-on, Ever-present

The largest mobile telecoms body, the GSM Association, representing companies serving over 2 billion users, is backing a project called Telco 2.0, designed to drive this area.

References

 Mobile Web 2.0: Developing and Delivering Services to Mobile Devices. CRC Press. 617 pages.
 Academic Podcasting and Mobile Assisted Language Learning: Applications and Outcomes: Applications and Outcomes
 Handbook of Research on Web 2.0 and Second Language Learning
 Mobile Design and Development
 Hybrid Learning and Education: First International Conference, ICHL 2008 Hong Kong, China, August 13-15, 2008

External links
 Mobile 2.0 Company Directory
 Mobile 2.0 Conference
 Mobile 2.0 Europe Conference
 mobeedo - an Open Multi-Purpose Information System for the Mobile Age
 Mobile 2.0 Slideshare Presentation by Rudy De Waele

Web 2.0
Mobile web
Social media